Medan Marelan (colonial name: Maryland) is one of 21 administrative districts (kecamatan} in the city of Medan, North Sumatra, Indonesia.

Boundaries of the district (Indonesian: kecamatan):
 To the north: Medan Belawan
 To the south: Medan Helvetia
 To the east: Medan Deli
 To the west: Deli Serdang Regency

At the 2010 Census, it had a population of 140,414 inhabitants, while at the 2015 Census, it had a population of 162,267 inhabitants; the latest official estimate (for mid 2019) is 175,382. Total area is 23.82 km2 and the population density in 2019 was 7,362.8 inhabitants/km2.

Residents 
Most residents in this district is the migrants whereas the tribal ethnic Malays Deli 30% only.

References 

Districts of Medan